Matson Run is a  long 1st order tributary to Shellpot Creek in New Castle County, Delaware.  This is the only stream of this name in the United States.

Variant names
According to the Geographic Names Information System, it has also been known historically as:
Mattsons Run

Course
Matson Run rises in Blue Ball, Delaware and then flows southeast to join Shellpot Creek at Bellefonte, Delaware.

Watershed
Matson Run drains  of area, receives about 47.2 in/year of precipitation, has a topographic wetness index of 499.25 and is about 11% forested.

See also
List of Delaware rivers

References

Rivers of Delaware
Rivers of New Castle County, Delaware
Tributaries of the Delaware River